Aung Zaw may refer to:
 Aung Zaw (footballer) (born 1990), Burmese footballer
 Aung Zaw (editor) ( 1968), Burmese journalist and editor